America Young (born December 6, 1984) is an American actress, director, writer, stunt performer and producer from Santa Fe, New Mexico. She has been the voice of Barbie since 2018, having previously voiced her in the Barbie Vlogger web series.

Filmography

Film

Television

Video games

References

External links

America Young at LinkedIn
America Young at Women In Media
America Young at Behind The Voice Actors

1984 births
Living people
American film actresses
Film directors from New Mexico
American stunt performers
American women film directors
American women film producers
American television actresses
Actors from Santa Fe, New Mexico
Actresses from New Mexico
American voice actresses